Monochamus stuhlmanni is a species of beetle in the family Cerambycidae. It was described by Kolbe in 1894. It is known from Rwanda, the Democratic Republic of the Congo, and Uganda.

References

stuhlmanni
Beetles described in 1894